Wadeoceras is a genus of nautiloids included in the Polyelasmoceratidae, a family of oncocerids living from the Middle Silurian to the Late Devonian.

The phragmocone of Wadeoceras is cyrtoconic (curved) and the living chamber, more orthoconic (straight).

References

 Walter C. Sweet, 1964. Nautiloidea -Oncocerida, Treatise on Invertebrate Paleontology, Part L, Mollusca 3. Geological Society of America and University of Kansas Press.

Prehistoric nautiloid genera
Silurian first appearances
Late Devonian animals
Late Devonian genus extinctions
Oncocerida